Baha' al-Din Naqshband (1318–1389) was the eponymous founder of what would become one of the largest Sufi Sunni orders, the Naqshbandi.

Background 
Baha al-Din was born in March 1318 in the village of Qasr-i Hinduvan, which was one farsakh from the city of Bukhara. Like the majority of the sedentary population of the region, Baha al-Din was a Tajik, i.e. a speaker of Persian and a participant in its culture. According to H. Algar / Encyclopædia Iranica, the texts that claim Baha al-Din was descended from the Islamic prophet Muhammad through Ja'far al-Sadiq (died 765), should be "treated with reserve". Early texts do not mention Baha al-Din's supposed ancestry to Muhammad, but they do imply that his teacher Amir Kulal (died 1370) was a descendant of Muhammad through Ja'far al-Sadiq, which may suggest that their genealogies were later mixed up.

On the other hand Annemarie Schimmel highlights the descent of Bahauddin from Hasan al Askari, referring to Khwaja Mir Dard's family and "many nobles, from Bukhara; they led their pedigree back to Baha`uddin Naqshband, after whom the Naqshbandi order is named, and who was a descendent, in the 13th generation of the 11th Shia imam al-Hasan al-Askari".

Life 
Three days after his birth, Baha al-Din was adopted as a spiritual son by Baba Mohammad Sammasi, a master of the Khwajagan, a Sufi order founded by Yusuf Hamadani (died 1140). It was Baha al-Din's paternal grandfather who brought him to Sammasi, as he was a murid (novice) of the latter. Sammasi later entrusted Baha al-Din's training to his distinguished student Amir Kulal.

Early texts do not mention how Baha al-Din gained the nickname "Naqshband", nor its meaning. An agreement was later partly reached that it referred to the naqsh (imprint) of the name of Allah that is firm in the heart through constant and continuous prayer. In Bukhara, Baha al-Din more practically became its patron saint and was commonly referred to as "Khwaja Bala-gardan" by its inhabitants. Amongst the members of the present-day Naqshbandi order, particularly in Turkey, Baha al-Din is known as "Shah-e Naqshband."

Some historians agree that the original Naqshbandi had a particularly Iranian or Khurasanian attitude, which according to H. Algar / Encyclopædia Iranica is supported by the fact that Baha al-Din was surrounded by a company of urban dwellers that mostly spoke Tajik. However, the Naqshbandi had also been influenced by Turkic Sufi order, the Yasawiyya, and thus had a Turkic component as well. Three generations after Baha al-Din's death, the Naqshbandi started receiving support among the Turkic inhabitants of Central Asia, thus displaying an all-inclusive appeal.

Baha al-Din died on 2 March 1389 in Qasr-i Hinduvan, which was then renamed Qasr-i Arifan out of respect to him.

References

Sources

Further reading 
 

1318 births
1389 deaths
Naqshbandi order
Sufi religious leaders
Sufis
Founders of Sufi orders
Sufi saints
Iranian Muslim mystics